Comin' On! is an album by Jamaican-born jazz trumpeter Dizzy Reece, featuring performances recorded at two sessions in 1960, but not released on the Blue Note label until 1999.

Reception

The Allmusic review by Al Campbell stated: "Neglected, although spirited, sessions from an underrated trumpeter and composer".

Track listing
All compositions by Dizzy Reece except as indicated
 "Ye Olde Blues" - 6:40  
 "The Case of the Frightened Lover" - 5:42  
 "Tenderly" (Walter Gross, Jack Lawrence) - 9:02  
 "Achmet" - 8:28  
 "The Story of Love" (Carlos Eleta Almarán) - 10:09  
 "Sands" - 6:40  
 "Comin' On" - 6:44  
 "Goose Dance" - 6:49  
 "The Things We Did Last Summer" (Jule Styne, Sammy Cahn) - 6:17
Recorded at Van Gelder Studio, Englewood Cliffs, New Jersey on April 3 (tracks 1–5) and July 17 (tracks 6–9), 1960

Personnel
Dizzy Reece - trumpet, conga
Stanley Turrentine - tenor saxophone 
Musa Kaleem - tenor saxophone, flute (tracks 6–9)
Bobby Timmons (tracks 1–5), Duke Jordan (tracks 6–9) - piano
Jymie Merritt (tracks 1–5), Sam Jones (tracks 6–9) - bass
Art Blakey (tracks 1–5), Al Harewood (tracks 6–9) - drums

References

Blue Note Records albums
Dizzy Reece albums
1999 albums
Albums recorded at Van Gelder Studio
Albums produced by Alfred Lion